Correlation: Two White Line Diagonals and Two Arcs with a Sixteen-Foot Radius, also known as Correlations, is a 1977–1978 by Robert Mangold, installed on the exterior of the Bricker Federal Building in Downtown Columbus, Ohio.

Description
The abstract artwork features ten orange porcelain enamel panels arranged on the building's facade. Each panel measures approximately 8 ft. x 4 ft. x 2 in. A nearby plaque reads: "Robert Mangold / Correlation: Two White / Line Diagonals And Two / Arcs With A 16 Foot Radius / 1977 / Commissioned Under The / Art-In-Architecture Program / General Services Administration / United States Of America."

History
Correlation cost $70,000 and was commissioned by the General Services Administration's Art-in-Architecture Program. The artwork was surveyed by the Smithsonian Institution's "Save Outdoor Sculpture!" program in 1994.

References

1970s establishments in Ohio
1970s sculptures
Abstract sculptures in the United States
Outdoor sculptures in Columbus, Ohio